Elizabeth Clementine Dodge Stedman (1810–1889) was an American writer. She was the author of Felicita, a Metrical Romance (1855), Poems (1867), and Bianca Cappello, A Tragedy (1873).

Biography
She was born Elizabeth Clementine Dodge in New York City on December 10, 1810. Her father was David Low Dodge, who helped establish the New York Peace Society. Her mother was Sarah Cleveland, the daughter of minister Aaron Cleveland.  Her brother was William E. Dodge, noted abolitionist, Native American rights activist, past president of the National Temperance Society, and founding member of YMCA of the USA.

Elizabeth was a contributor to the Knickerbocker and to Blackwood's. During a 14-year stay in Europe she was a friend of Robert Browning and Elizabeth Barrett Browning. She published Felicita, a Metrical Romance (1855), Poems (1867), and Bianco Capello, A Tragedy (1873), written during her time abroad in Italy.

Personal life

She married Edmund Burke Stedman, a merchant from Hartford, Connecticut, in 1830 at age 19. He died of tuberculosis in December 1835. They had two sons, the eldest was the poet and critic Edmund Clarence Stedman.

In 1841, she married the U.S. diplomat and politician, William Burnet Kinney. They remained married until his death in 1880. They had two children:
Elizabeth Clementine Kinney who married William Ingraham Kip Jr. (1840-1902), the rector of Good Samaritan Missions in San Francisco and the son of Episcopal bishop and missionary to California, William Ingraham Kip. They had four children, three of whom survived to adulthood: Elizabeth Clementine Kip (married Guy L. Eddie of the U.S. Army); Lawrence Kip; and Mary Burnet Kip (married to Dr. Ernest Franklin Robertson of Kansas City, KS).
Mary Burnet Kinney.

Her great-great-grandsons are businesspeople Frederick R. Koch, Charles Koch, David Koch, and Bill Koch.

Death 
She died on November 19, 1889 in Summit, New Jersey at the age of 78.

Notes

References

1810 births
1889 deaths
19th-century American poets
Writers from New York City
Dodge family
American women poets
19th-century American women writers
YMCA leaders